Gebeng Bypass, Federal Route 101, AH141, is a highway bypass connecting Jabur, Terengganu to Gebeng near Kuantan Port, Pahang, Malaysia.

Route background
The Kilometre Zero of Federal Route 101 starts at Gebeng Interchange, at its interchange with the Federal Route 3, the main trunk road of the east coast of Peninsular Malaysia.

History
The highway is part of the East Coast Expressway Phase 1 project (Karak - Jabur). Construction began on 2003 and was opened to traffic in December 2006. Meanwhile, the next sections between Jabur Interchange of the East Coast Expressway to Jabur was opened to traffic on 15 July 2007. In 2012, the highway was gazetted as Federal Route 101.

Features
 Aspa Cottage.
 Gebeng Industrial Area.
 BASF-Petronas petrochemical plant.
 Lynas MalaysiaLynas Advanced Materials Plant (LAMP).
 Malaysia-China Kuantan Industrial Park is a joint venture industrial park between Malaysia and the People's Republic of China.
 Akademi Maritim Sultan Ahmad Shah (AMSAS), the Malaysian Maritime Enforcement Agency (MMEA) Academy.

At most sections, the Gebeng Bypass was built under the JKR R5 road standard, allowing maximum speed limit of up to 90 km/h.

There are no overlaps, alternate routes, or sections with motorcycle lanes.

List of interchanges

Jabor-ECE sections

Jabur-Gebeng sections

References

Highways in Malaysia
Malaysian Federal Roads